The 1900 Olympic Croquet doubles tournament has only one double from France known. It was held on 22 July 1900. The rest of the results are unknown. Gaston Aumoitte and Georges Johin, who had taken first and second in the singles one-ball event, were the winning pair. Very little is known about the event, including the competition format.

Background

This was the only appearance of the event at the Olympics; it was one of three croquet competitions in 1900. Croquet was one of the first Olympic sports open to women (with only sailing having female competitors before croquet, due to that sport taking place earlier in 1900); it is unknown whether any women competed in the doubles.

Schedule

References

 De Wael, Herman. Herman's Full Olympians: "Croquet 1900". Accessed 10 January 2006.
 Mallon, Bill. "The First Two Women Olympians" in Citius, Altius, Fortius, Autumn 1995, No. 3, p. 38. Available in pdf format from the AAFLA .
 

Doubles